Khamoshi is a 2019 Indian Hindi-language slasher film directed by Chakri Toleti and produced by Pyx Films. The film stars Tamannaah in the lead role as a deaf and mute girl with Prabhu Deva in the lead antagonistic role. This film is a remake of the 2016 American film, Hush and a remake of the delayed 2019 Tamil Hush remake Kolaiyuthir Kaalam which starred Nayanthara in the lead role, and was also directed by Toleti. The film was theatrically released in India after delays on 14 June 2019.

Cast 
 Tamannaah as Surbhi
 Prabhu Deva as Dev
 Bhumika Chawla as Mrs. Desai
 Sanjay Suri as Kishore Desai
 Vikram Bhatt as Dev's Father
 Deepak Anand as Lawyer Deepakji
 Akash Khurana as Advocate Anand
 Vipin Sharma as Mushtaaq

Production 
In March 2017, Chakri Toleti revealed that his new Bollywood Film is in production with Vashu Bhagnani. The film was shot entirely in London, and within 25 days, the entire shoot of the film was completed. Tamannaah is playing titular role of a deaf and mute girl whereas Prabhu Deva is playing an antagonist. Bhumika Chawla is in a pivotal role in the film.

Release 
The film was released on 14 June 2019 in India theatrically.

Reception 
Pallabi Dey Purkayastha of The Times of India giving the film two stars out of five, feels that the film fails to hold attention of audience for too long and calls it a half-baked broth of a thriller. She concludes, "Khamoshi' shines in the beginning but then it becomes ice-cold half way into its murky narrative."

Soundtrack 

The music of the film is composed by Shamir Tandon and lyrics are penned by Zeest. Rap was written and performed by Babu Haabi. Zee Music Company holds the rights of music. The original background score is composed by Simaab Sen.

References

External links 
 
 

2010s Hindi-language films
Indian psychological thriller films
Indian slasher films
Indian supernatural horror films
Indian remakes of American films
Hindi remakes of English films
Hindi remakes of Tamil films
Films scored by Shamir Tandon
Indian horror film remakes
2010s slasher films
Films about deaf people
Films directed by Chakri Toleti